Arnoldo Sergio Santaella Sendel (born November 4, 1966) is a Mexican actor, best known for playing antagonistic roles in Mexican telenovelas.

He won the TVyNovelas Award for Best Male Antagonist in 2008 for his role as Aarón Montalvo Iturbe in Destilando Amor. In May 2020 it was announced by Telemundo that Sendel will return to acting.

Life and career
Sergio Sendel was born in Mexico City, Mexico on November 4, 1966. He is the son of Elsa Sendel. He divorced from Marcela Rodriguez in 2012 after 16 years of marriage, Sendel has two children, twins Elsa Valeria and Sergio Graco.

On December 8, 2007, he received a star on the Paseo de las Luminarias alley in the Plaza de las Estrellas.

1990s
Sendel made his television debut in 1990, appearing in telenovelas such as Mi pequeña Soledad in 1990 as Gustavo and Alcanzar una estrella II in 1991. In 1992, he had a supporting role in Muchachitas as Pedro. Later in 1993 he got his second supporting role in Dos mujeres, un camino.

His first role as an antagonist was in the 1999 telenovela Tres mujeres.

2000s
Sendel continued to portray antagonistic roles in other telenovelas such as Ramona, La intrusa and La Otra.

Sendel provided his voice to Diego in the Latin American Spanish dub of the film Ice Age. Although he was originally contracted to voice for the character again in the sequel, he left the project when the producers would not meet his financial demands.

He had his first protagonist role in 2004 with Amarte es mi Pecado alongside Yadhira Carrillo and Alessandra Rosaldo. He marked his second protagonist role in 2005 in Salvador Mejía's production La esposa virgen alongside Jorge Salinas, Adela Noriega and Natalia Esperón. He returned to play antagonistic roles in 2006 with the telenovela Heridas de Amor as César Beltrán Campuzano.

In 2007, he was the antagonist in Destilando amor working with Eduardo Yañez and is one of his most notable performances since he was awarded the 2008 TVyNovelas Awards for Best Male Antagonist.

In 2008, Sendel and Lucero played the antagonists in the Nicandro Diaz production Mañana es para siempre, alongside Silvia Navarro and Fernando Colunga.

2010s
In 2011, he returned to telenovelas in Una familia con suerte as Vicente Irabien, alongside Daniela Castro and Mayrín Villanueva.

In July 2013, he was confirmed to star in the Angelli Nesma production Lo que la vida me robó together with a ensemble cast consisting of Daniela Castro, Angelique Boyer and Luis Roberto Guzmán. Sendel played Pedro Medina, Nadia's (Alejandra Garcia) ambitious and cruel husband.

In 2015, he was part of the main cast in Lo imperdonable, a Salvador Mejía production, working together with Ana Brenda Contreras, Iván Sánchez and Grettel Valdéz.

Filmography

Film

Television

Accolades

Premios TVyNovelas

Premios Bravo

People en Español

References

External links

1966 births
Living people
Mexican male telenovela actors
Mexican male television actors
Male actors from Mexico City